William Henry Crain (November 25, 1848 – February 10, 1896) was a U.S. Representative from Texas.

Born in Galveston, Texas, Crain attended the Christian Brothers' School, New York City, until the age of fourteen, and graduated from St. Francis Xavier's College, New York City, in 1867. He returned to Texas and lived on a ranch for two years. He studied law in Indianola, Texas, while teaching school. He was admitted to the bar in 1871 and commenced practice in Indianola, Texas. He served as member of the Texas Senate 1876-1878. He served as district attorney of the twenty-third judicial district of Texas 1872-1876.

Crain served in the national Democratic convention in 1880. He was elected as a Democrat to the Forty-ninth and to the five succeeding Congresses, serving from March 4, 1885, until his death in Washington, D.C., February 10, 1896. In Congress he opposed both prohibition and the free silver movement. He served as chairman of the Committee on Expenditures on Public Buildings during the Fifty-third Congress.

He died from pneumonia in Washington on February 10, 1896. After his death, a fellow Congressman from Texas noted that "Mr. Crain was a poor man; he did not possess the money-making faculty." He was interred in Hillside Cemetery, Cuero, Texas.

See also
List of United States Congress members who died in office (1790–1899)

Sources

1848 births
1896 deaths
Texas lawyers
People from Galveston, Texas
Xavier High School (New York City) alumni
Democratic Party Texas state senators
Democratic Party members of the United States House of Representatives from Texas
19th-century American politicians
People from Calhoun County, Texas
19th-century American lawyers